Masatsugu Sei Suzuki is a Japanese-American physicist. He is a professor of physics and is affiliated with the Institute for Materials Research at Binghamton University. He has published 155 scientific papers in peer-reviewed journals.

Education and career
Dr. Suzuki received his B.S. and M.S. degrees in electrical engineering from Yokohama National University in 1971 and 1973, respectively. He received his Ph.D. in physics from the University of Tokyo.

After completing his Ph.D., Suzuki was a research associate with the Department of Physics at Ochanomizu University in Tokyo, Japan until 1984. He has been a member of the physics faculty at Binghamton University since 1986. Prior to joining the physics department at Binghamton, he spent a year as a visiting scientist with the Department of Physics at the University of Illinois at Urbana-Champaign followed by a year as a visiting scientist with Schlumberger-Doll Research in Ridgefield, Connecticut.

Research

Suzuki primarily investigates the structural and magnetic properties of various graphite intercalation compounds.

Other interests

In his spare time, Suzuki enjoys traveling with his family. He works along with his wife, Professor Itsuko Suzuki, in adjacent offices at Binghamton University. They frequently take walks together around campus.

Book

Most cited papers
Suzuki has published over 100 scientific papers. The following is a short list of some of his most cited papers.

References

External links
 Suzuki's Binghamton Profile
 Binghamton University physics department
 Materials Science and Engineering program at Binghamton University

Living people
21st-century American physicists
Japanese physicists
Japanese materials scientists
Binghamton University faculty
State University of New York faculty
Year of birth missing (living people)
Japanese emigrants to the United States
American academics of Japanese descent
Yokohama National University alumni
University of Tokyo alumni
Academic staff of Ochanomizu University